Abdalla Targan (born 28 September 1996) is a Sudanese middle distance runner. He competed at the 2016 Summer Olympics in the men's 3000 metres steeplechase; his time of 8:52.20 in the heats did not qualify him for the final. He was the flag bearer for Sudan in the Parade of Nations.

References

1996 births
Living people
Sudanese male middle-distance runners
Sudanese steeplechase runners
Olympic athletes of Sudan
Athletes (track and field) at the 2016 Summer Olympics